The Manzolini Libellula was a 1950s Italian co-axial twin-rotor helicopter designed by Ettore Manzolini. "Libellula" is the Italian word for "Dragonfly".

Design and development
Ettore Manzolini established a company in Rome, Italy to develop a helicopter he had designed. The design was the Manzolini Libellula an unusual co-axial helicopter. The co-axial arrangement eliminating the need for an anti-torque rotor allowed the helicopter to have a twin fin arrangement. The Libellula (Registered I-MANZ) first flew on 7 January 1952. An improved version was the single-seat Libellula II which went on to gain Italian certification on 15 October 1962. A three-seater version (the Libellula III) was built and a four-seat Libellula IV was planned but Manzolini stopped development in the late 1960s.

Variants
Libellula
Prototype, one built.
Libellula II
Prototype single-seat version powered by a 75kW (101hp) Walter Minor 4-III engine, one built.
Libellula III
Prototype two-seat version powered by a 104kW (140hp) Walter M 332 engine, one built but not flown.
Libellula IV
Proposed four-seat version powered by a 236kW (317shp) Allison 250-CT18 turboshaft, not built.

Specifications (Libellula II)

References

 Apostolo, Giorgio. The Illustrated Encyclopedia of Helicopters. New York: Bonanza Books, 1984. Pg.123 .

External links 
 https://www.webcitation.org/query?url=http://www.geocities.com/CapeCanaveral/Launchpad/5249/manzolini.htm&date=2009-10-25+15:56:04

1950s Italian helicopters
1950s Italian civil utility aircraft
Aircraft first flown in 1952
Single-engined piston helicopters